Susan Finsen is an American philosopher, currently professor emeritus of philosophy and former chair of the department at California State University, San Bernardino. She specializes in moral philosophy, with a particular interest in animal rights, as well as philosophy of science and philosophy of biology. She is the co-author, with her husband Lawrence Finsen, of The Animal Rights Movement in America: From Compassion to Respect (1994), and is the director of Californians for the Ethical Treatment of Animals.

Finsen received her PhD in philosophy from Indiana University in 1982.  Susan Finsen was formerly known as Susan K. Mills.

Notes

Year of birth missing (living people)
Living people
20th-century American philosophers
21st-century American philosophers
20th-century American women
21st-century American women
American animal rights scholars
American ethicists
American women philosophers
Animal ethicists
California State University, San Bernardino faculty
Historians of animal rights
Indiana University alumni
Philosophers from California
Philosophers of biology
Philosophers of science